Joseph Matthew Martin (born December 29, 1962) is a retired general in the United States Army who served as the 37th Vice Chief of Staff of the  Army from 2019 to 2022. He previously served as the director of the Army Staff in Washington, D.C.

Education
A native of Dearborn, Michigan and the son of a Ford Motor Company executive, Martin graduated from Dearborn High School in 1981.  He graduated from the United States Military Academy at West Point in 1986.

Martin earned a master's degree from the University of Louisville, and graduated from the U.S. Army Command and General Staff College and the U.S. Army War College.

Military career
After graduating the United States Military Academy, Martin served as a tank platoon leader, scout platoon leader, and company executive officer in the 1st Battalion, 37th Armor Regiment, in the 1st Armored Division (1987 to 1990). Upon graduation from the Armor Officer Advanced Course, he was assigned to 4th Battalion, 37th Armor Regiment in the 1st Infantry Division where he commanded Company B during Operation Desert Storm and at Fort Riley, Kansas.

Martin was assigned at the National Training Center and Fort Irwin in California as the Commanding General. He participated in Operation Iraqi Freedom as the commander of 1st Battalion of the 67th Armor Regiment in the 4th Infantry Division. He was also the commander of the Combined Joint Forces Land Component Command Operation Inherent Resolve in Mosul in the fight against the Islamic State of Iraq and Syria (ISIS or ISIL).

Martin was the commanding general of the 1st Infantry Division from September 2016 to May 2018.

In May 2018, Martin was nominated for promotion to lieutenant general and an assignment as the Director of the Army Staff. On July 26, 2019, he was assigned as the Army's 37th Vice Chief of Staff and promoted to general.

Awards and decorations
Joseph M. Martin is the recipient of the following awards:

References

|-

|-

|-

1962 births
United States Army personnel of the Gulf War
United States Army personnel of the Iraq War
Living people
Recipients of the Defense Superior Service Medal
Recipients of the Distinguished Service Medal (US Army)
Recipients of the Legion of Merit
United States Army generals
United States Military Academy alumni
University of Louisville alumni
United States Army Vice Chiefs of Staff